The Dahlem Centre of Plant Sciences (DCPS) is a department of the Free University of Berlin established in June 2009. The department supports the Botanical Garden Berlin-Dahlem, a large botanical garden and collection. The Dahlem Centre of Plant Sciences supports the research of various plant science disciplines, provides a platform for interdisciplinary, collaborative research initiatives, and supports a variety of outreach activities. Members of the Dahlem Centre of Plant Sciences are involved in teaching plant biology at different levels including programs for the general public.

Overview 
The Dahlem Centre of Plant Sciences (DCPS) is a modern centre
for plant sciences at Freie Universität Berlin. As a Freie Universität
Berlin research department, it is supported by funds
from the university’s future development strategy. The DCPS
prioritizes interdisciplinary research. Fields include a wide spectrum of plant sciences such as molecular and cell biology, genetics, biochemistry, plant
physiology, developmental biology, systematics and taxonomy,
plant geography,
ecology and pharmaceutical biology. The Berlin-Dahlem location
was already the site of a plant science
centre in the early 1900s. Research aims to play its part in a comprehensive understanding
of plant diversity, preserving that diversity, and facilitating
the sustainable use of plant resources. The DCPS also educates young scholars and early career researchers.  Doctoral students
study at the Plant Sciences graduate school
under the umbrella of the Dahlem Research School.

Main research areas
DCPS projects focus on two major research areas: “Function and Diversity”
and “Plant and Environment”. The research findings from both
areas are transferred to practices supporting sustainable use and
the protection of plant diversity. This involves the development of genetic resources (Applied Plant Sciences)
to
the management of varied eco-systems. Public relations and communication
tools are also used to present the findings in a more
accessible form to a broader audience.
Function and Diversity research aims to produce new insights into
the evolutionary development of the morphological and functional
diversity of plants. The evolution of new traits and the mechanisms
of genome evolutions are studied by combining comparative genomics
with phylogenetic, biochemical and molecular techniques.
The topics addressed include the evolution and function of signal
transfer processes in plant cells, the role of the numerous plant
secondary metabolites, the uptake and use of nutrients as
well as the development of morphological features. This work is
based on the rapidly growing information available from genome
sequencing. These projects explore organisms beyond the model plant
Arabidopsis to improve understanding
of gene functions and the evolution of biological diversity.
The close links to the newly established Berlin Consortium for Genomics
in Biodiversity Research play a significant role in research
into genome sequence and structure.
In the Plant and Environment field of research, the focus is on
plant functions and adaptive reactions in the context of constantly
changing environmental conditions. The research concentrates on plant reactions to such abiotic
stress factors as light intensity, extremes of temperature, lack of
water and nutrients, as well as plant biotic interactions with other
organisms, for example, insects or fungi. The research groups
are working on such diverse themes as, for instance, the responses
of plants to pathogens, plants’ cellular memory for environmental
stress, the role of root architecture in fungi colonisation and its
significance for crop yields and the mechanisms of communication between neighbouring
plants.

External links 
 Homepage of Dahlem Centre of Plant Sciences
 Homepage of the doctoral program Plant Sciences
 Publications of Dahlem Centre of Plant Sciences

Free University of Berlin